14+: Continued is an upcoming Russian  coming-of-age romantic film directed by Andrey Zaytsev, a sequel to the 2015 film 14+.

Plot 
The film tells about the formation of a young guy who asks questions about feelings for family and friends, as well as his own life.

Cast

References

External links 
 

2020s Russian-language films
2020s coming-of-age drama films
Russian coming-of-age drama films
Russian romantic drama films
Upcoming Russian-language films
Unreleased films